Grazer Philosophische Studien/International Journal for Analytic Philosophy is a peer-reviewed academic journal on philosophy published by Rodopi Publishers. It was established in 1975 by Rudolf Haller and is currently edited by Johannes L. Brandl (University of Salzburg), Marian David (University of Graz), Maria E. Reicher-Marek (University of Aachen), and Leopold Stubenberg (University of Notre Dame). At least two volumes of the journal appear each year, including special issues on selected topics. The journal covers all aspects of philosophy, especially analytical philosophy. Contributions are in English or German.

See also 
 List of philosophy journals

External links 
 

Analytic philosophy literature
Philosophy journals
Contemporary philosophical literature
Multilingual journals
Publications established in 1975
Philosophy Documentation Center academic journals
Brill Publishers academic journals
Irregular journals